This article show all participating team squads at the 2005 FIVB Women's Volleyball World Grand Prix, played by twelve countries from June 24 to July 18, 2005 with the final round held in Sendai, Japan.

Head Coach: José Roberto Guimarães

Head Coach: Chen Zhonghe

Head Coach: Luis Felipe Calderón

Head Coach: Francisco Cruz Jimenez

Head Coach: Lee Hee-Wan

Head Coach: Marco Bonitta

Head Coach: Shoichi Yanagimoto

Head Coach: Kim Hyung-sil

Head Coach: Avital Selinger

Head Coach: Andrzej Niemczyk

Head Coach: Sutchai Chanbunchee

Head Coach: Lang Ping

References
FIVB Line-ups

2005
2005 in volleyball